The 2010 Copa de España de Fútbol Sala is the 21st staging of the Copa de España de Fútbol Sala. It was held in the Pabellón Multiusos Fontes Do Sar, in Santiago de Compostela, Spain, between 11 February and 14 February 2010.

Qualified teams

Final tournament

Knockout stage

Quarter-finals

Semi-finals

Final

See also
 2009–10 División de Honor de Futsal

References

External links
LNFS website

Copa de España de Futsal seasons
Espana
Futsal